The Brazilian Medical Association founded in 1951, is the national class association of physicians in Brazil. With more than 140,000 associates, it is the second largest in the Americas, just after the American Medical Association.
Its official journal, Revista da Associação Médica Brasileira, is published by Elsevier.

External links
 Brazilian Medical Association

References

Medical associations based in Brazil
Organizations established in 1951
1951 establishments in Brazil